The 361st Africa Infantry Regiment (Infanterie-Regiment Afrika 361) was a unit of the German Army (Wehrmacht) which served with the 90th Africa Division of the Africa Corps in the Western Desert campaign. It was constituted from Germans who had served in the French Foreign Legion before the Battle of France in May and June 1940.

In the aftermath of the French campaign, the German Armistice Commission exercised pressure on the newly constituted Vichy regime to repatriate German nationals serving as légionnaires in French North Africa. Although the Legion established significant obstacles to prevent repatriation, some Germans did voluntarily return out of fear of incurring worse sanctions from the Nazi regime if they refused to comply. According to the historian Douglas Porch, "most of these men must have been legionnaires of fairly ancient vintage, as those Germans coming into the Legion after 1934 were increasingly Jews and other political refugees who would not have risked repatriation".

Initially formed as the 361st Africa Regiment and used for military labour, it was armed and re-designated as an infantry regiment in April 1942 and was close to the fighting at the Battle of Bir Hakeim in which the 13th Demi-Brigade of the Foreign Legion (13 DBLE) fought for the Free French.

References

Bibliography

Regiments of the German Army in World War II
French Foreign Legion
Military units and formations established in 1942
German units in Africa